The Kitschies are British literary prizes presented annually for "the year's most progressive, intelligent and entertaining works that contain elements of the speculative or fantastic" published in the United Kingdom.

Awards and criteria
The Kitschies are administered by a non-profit association with the stated mission of "encouraging and elevating the tone of the discussion of genre literature in its many forms". The founders, Anne C. Perry and Jared Shurin, said that they sought to bring attention to works with a fantastic or speculative element that are progressive in terms of content and composition.

The award is a juried prize that selects those books which "best elevate the tone of genre literature". Qualifying books must contain "an element of the fantastic or speculative" and have been published in the UK.  Winners receive a sum of prize money and a textile tentacle trophy.

The Kitschies are governed by an advisory board of members. They were initially established in 2009 by the website pornokitsch.com. The Kraken Rum was the sponsor between 2010 and 2013. For 2014 and 2015, Fallen London (a creation of UK game developer Failbetter Games), was the sponsor. The award did not run in 2016. From 2017 the sponsor is Blackwell's Bookshop.

, the Kitschies are awarded in five categories:
Red Tentacle for the best novel (£1,000, since 2009)
Golden Tentacle for the best debut novel (£500, since 2010)
Inky Tentacle for the best cover art (£500, since 2011)
Invisible Tentacle for the best natively digital fiction (since 2014)
Glentacle, awarded at the judges' discretion (since 2010, called "Black Tentacle" until 2020)

Organisation 
The judging panels changes annually and the unpaid directors have changed due to workload or illness.  The number of submissions has increased from 70 in 2009 to a record of 234 in 2013.

For each year, the judges, directors, and the number of submissions for each year are as follows:

Recipients
All award information, unless otherwise referenced, is from the Kitschies Award's blog and tumblr, or from the sponsor Blackwell's website.

Red Tentacle (best novel)

Golden Tentacle (best debut novel)

Inky Tentacle (best cover art)

Invisible Tentacle (best natively digital fiction)

Glentacle (Discretionary award previously called the Black Tentacle)
This award was called "Black Tentacle" until 2020, when it was renamed in memory of Kitschies co-founder Glen Mehn.

References

External links
The Kitschies website

English literary awards
Awards established in 2009
2009 establishments in England
Science fiction awards
Fantasy awards